The 1892 United States presidential election in Florida took place on November 8, 1892. All contemporary 44 states were part of the 1892 United States presidential election. Florida voters chose four electors to the Electoral College, which selected the president and vice president.

Background
This election marks the end of Reconstruction and the beginning of Jim Crow-era politics in Florida. This change had been proposed as early as 1884, but the anti-Southern animus of the Harrison regime meant that Florida's large landowners felt the disfranchisement of blacks had become urgent. A poll tax was introduced in 1889 as were the so-called “Myers” and “Dortch” laws which required voters in more populous settlements to register their voting precincts. This dramatically cut voter registration amongst blacks and poorer whites, almost halving the number of votes cast. Since Florida completely lacked upland or German refugee whites opposed to secession, its Republican Party between 1872 and 1888 was entirely dependent upon black votes. Thus this disfranchisement of blacks and poor whites by a poll tax introduced in 1889 left Florida as devoid of Republican adherents as Louisiana, Mississippi or South Carolina.

Thus, Florida's few remaining Republicans decided not to put up presidential electors and urged their supported to back Populist James B. Weaver, creating the first case where an incumbent president standing for re-election has not been on all state's ballots. Weaver thought he had “magnificent” chances in the impoverished South, and campaigned heavily there. but as it turned out the halving of the electorate meant he could gain very little support. Weaver was not helped by his controversial decision to take a woman – Mary Lease – on his campaigns, as the South thought any political involvement degraded womanhood. Weaver did nonetheless win counties in Alabama, Georgia, Mississippi, North Carolina, and Texas.

Vote
Florida was won in a landslide by the Democratic nominees, former President Grover Cleveland of New York and his running mate Adlai Stevenson I of Illinois in what remains as the best performance in Florida as of 2020. Weaver took what remained of the Negro Republican vote, but gained less than 14%; nonetheless this is one of only five times in Florida that a candidate other than a Republican or Democrat got over 10% of the vote.

Results

Results by county

Notes

References

Florida
1892
1892 Florida elections